Daryn A. Kagan (born January 26, 1963) is an American broadcast journalist, formerly a news anchor for CNN.

From 1994 to 2006, Kagan served as an anchor and correspondent for CNN, in CNN's corporate headquarters of Atlanta, Georgia. She anchored CNN Live Today shown from 10am-12pm Eastern Time for eight years. She also served as host of the CNN/People news entertainment program, People in the News, and earlier served as a CNN sports reporter and anchor.

Biography

Early life
Kagan grew up in a secular Jewish family in Beverly Hills, California. She is a 1981 graduate of Beverly Hills High School where she ran cross-country, and a 1985 graduate of Stanford University.

Career
After graduating from Stanford, Kagan sent out hundreds of demo tapes. Kagan was hired for an on-air job at a Santa Barbara television station, KEYT-TV. Kagan's next move was to a general assignment reporting position at KTVK in Phoenix. Wanting to do something other than report typical local news stories, she took on the additional role of weekend sports anchor, reporting sports news each weekend in addition to her weekday reporting duties.

After KTVK did not renew Kagan's contract, Jim Walton, the head of CNN/SI, hired Kagan as sports anchor and correspondent. She went on to cover events that included the Super Bowl, the NBA Playoffs, and international figure skating championships from Russia. Kagan was later hired from CNN Sports by CNN's news division and became a main CNN news anchor and correspondent.

After becoming a CNN news anchor, Kagan reported on presidential and mid-term elections. She reported on-site from the Middle East during the second Gulf War and the Washington, D.C. sniper attack investigation. Kagan traveled to Africa with musician Bono where she reported on AIDS and famine for all of the CNN networks. While in Africa, Kagan maintained a daily blog on CNN.com of her reports and experiences. Additionally, she reported live, from the red carpet, of several Academy Awards ceremonies and from the Monterey Jazz Festival.

She has been prank called three times on the air by Captain Janks from the Howard Stern show.

Kagan is one of a handful of national news anchors who was on the air live during the terrorist attacks on the morning of September 11, 2001. She reported throughout that day and, in later days, covered the unfolding story from CNN headquarters in Atlanta and from the network's Washington, D.C. bureau.

After CNN declined to renew her employment contract, Kagan left CNN on September 1, 2006, to launch DarynKagan.com. In November 2006, Kagan discussed leaving CNN for the first time with U.S News & World Report.

Kagan launched DarynKagan.com, on November 13, 2006.  The Boston Globe has described Kagan's site as having as "bucking the media tide with an emphasis on stories that illustrate the triumph of the human spirit." In an interview with the Los Angeles Times, Kagan discussed her career reinvention, and said "I think it's really important to be informed. I just also think it's important to be inspired."

Kagan has extended her DarynKagan.com brand of content to television news documentaries, radio, and books. Her first TV film, Breaking the Curse, aired on PBS and won the 2008 Gracie Award for Outstanding Documentary. Kagan produced and narrated the film, which told the present day story of one American woman fighting for those living with leprosy in India. Kagan's first book, What's Possible!, was released in 2008 by Meredith Books, and was described by the Associated Press as "stories about people who overcame obstacles to achieve dreams." Her next film, Solartown USA, about a Wisconsin town that made a commitment to solar power in the 1970s.  Oprah Radio began to run DarynKagan.com content each day beginning in March 2009 on SIRIUS XM radio.

Awards
Kagan's post-CNN projects have been honored with awards that include the 2008 Gracie Award for Outstanding Documentary for her PBS film Breaking the Curse, as well as the Interactive Media Award for DarynKagan.com, which serves as the base of her media company.

Personal life
Kagan sees her story as one of "reinvention," and she speaks around the country on that topic. Kagan is Jewish. Her great-grandfather was a Russian immigrant named Eiser Cohen who came to the United States through Ellis Island. Cohen settled in Milwaukee, Wisconsin. Her grandfather, Jack Kagan, later moved to the Los Angeles area. Her mother, Phyllis Kagan, is a breast cancer survivor who has appeared on CNN discussing the disease. Kagan has a younger sister named Kallan, an executive at Arc Productions, and an older brother named Mark.

Kagan was an athlete: she was on her high school track team and remains an avid runner. She has been on ESPN sports radio providing her insight.

In September 2004, Kagan became romantically involved with radio talk show host Rush Limbaugh, but they broke up in February 2006.

Kagan has adopted a three-legged cat, Tripod, and a dog, Darla Louise, from rescue shelters.

Kagan is married to Trent Swanson and is stepmother to his two daughters. The marriage took place sometime before 2015.

References

External links
Official website

American television news anchors
People from Beverly Hills, California
American people of Russian-Jewish descent
1963 births
Living people
Stanford University alumni
CNN people
Journalists from California